Ilarion Ciobanu (28 October 1931 – 7 September 2008) was a Romanian actor. He has been described as "a legend" in the press and the last true Romanian comic.

Biography
Ciobanu was born in Ciucur, Tighina County, Kingdom of Romania (now Moldova), in a family with six brothers. When he was 8, his father, Vlase, a longshoreman in the Port of Constanța, died in an accident. His mother, Olga, moved to Constanța, where she had to work as a cook at a hospital to support her children, two of whom would die due to illness. From age 12, Ciobanu held a variety of jobs: he worked as a longshoreman, farmer, tractor driver, miner, digger, carpenter, sailor, and fisherman. He distinguished himself as a volunteer at the building of the Bumbești–Livezeni railroad; as a dump truck driver, he transported stone from Ovidiu for the construction of the Danube–Black Sea Canal.

Starting in 1948 he played rugby, first with Știința București, then with Dinamo București and finally (from 1959 to 1962) with Progresul București. In 1958 he was admitted at the I.L. Caragiale Institute of Theatre and Film Arts in Bucharest, but did not finish his studies. Instead, he worked as electrician at the Bulandra Theatre and made his debut in the movie Thirst.

Ciobanu married twice (and divorced twice) Tamara Barna, a dancer with the Ciocârlia ensemble. In 1972, he married Marion; the two adopted Natalia Doina, the daughter from his wife's first marriage, and in 1978 their son Ioachim was born.

He died in Bucharest at age 76 of laryngeal cancer; according to his wishes, his remains were cremated and his ashes were thrown into the Black Sea.

Selected filmography

 Thirst (1961) – Mitru Moț
  (1962)
  (1962) – Popescu
 Lupeni 29 (1963) – Danet
  (1964) – Gheorghe II
 Răscoala (1965) – Petre Petre
 Golgota (1966)
  (1966)
 Dacii (1966) – Gerula
  (1968) — Redea
 The Column (1968) – Gerula, a Dacian Captain
  (1969) – shephard Nichifor Lipan
  (1969) – Pavel Costan
  (1970) – Ghinda
 Michael the Brave (1971) – Stroe Buzescu
  (1971)
  (1971) – Gavrilă Drăgan
  (1971) – Ilarion
  (1971) – Pintea
  (1972) – Pavel
 Cu mâinile curate (1972) – Mihai Roman
  (1972)
 Ultimul cartuș (1973) – Mihai Roman
  (1973) – Mihai Roman
  (1973)
  (1973) – Mihai Roman
  (1973) – Johannes Pierre Fripp
  (1974) - Commissioner Mihai Roman
 Nemuritorii (1974) – Vasile
  (1975) – Johannes Pierre Fripp
  (1975) – Dan Cernega
 No Trespassing (1975) – Ilarie
 Toate pînzele sus (1976-1978, TV Series) – Gherasim Sotir
  (1977) – Captain Moise Grozea
  (1977)
 The Prophet, the Gold and the Transylvanians (1978) – Traian Brad
  (1978) – Teodosie Lazăr
  (1978) – Hăisan
 The Actress, the Dollars and the Transylvanians (1978) – Traian Brad
  (1978)
  (1978) – officer Percea
  (1978) – Tudose Volintiru
 Mihail, câine de circ (1979) – Captain Duncan
  (1979) – Vasile Mutu
  (1979)
  (1980) – colonel Cristescu
  (1980)
  (1980) – Vârlan
 The Oil, the Baby and the Transylvanians (1981) – Traian Brad de la Poplaca
  (1981) – Dăneț
  (1981)
  (1983) – Tudor
  (1984) – Ion Barbu
 Acasă (1985) – Moș Culai
  (1986) – sergeant Oancea
  (1986) – Octavian Borcea
  (1987) – father Ionel
  (1988) – Baciul Iuga
  (1994) – Fane
  (1995) — nea Parfenie
  (2003) – Părintele Petrian
  (2006) – Oana's father
  (2006) – Romeo Protopopescu
 '' (2007) – Rodia's father

References

External links

1931 births
2008 deaths
Romanian people of Moldovan descent
People from Cimișlia District
Romanian rugby union players
Romanian male film actors
The Transylvanians series
Deaths from cancer in Romania
Deaths from laryngeal cancer